Torodora glyptosema is a moth in the family Lecithoceridae. It was described by Edward Meyrick in 1938. It is found in China.

References

Moths described in 1938
Torodora